Belsize Wood is a 0.7 hectare Local Nature Reserve and a Site of Borough Importance for Nature Conservation, Grade II, in Belsize Park in the London Borough of Camden. It is a steeply sloping site divided into a northern half, which is always open to the public and is of lesser ecological value, and a southern part which is in a better state of conservation, and which is only open at weekends. The two halves are separated by a public footpath between Lawn Road and Aspern Grove. The site is owned and managed by Camden Council.

History
A railway tunnel runs under the site, built by the Midland Railway Company, which owned the site in the 1860s, and there is a railway ventilation shaft in the north west corner. From 1948 British Railways leased the land for various uses, including tennis courts and nursery gardens. In 1971 Camden Council acquired the land, and in the 1980s built the Russell Nurseries housing estate on the western part, leaving the eastern part undeveloped to become the nature reserve. The modernist Isokon Building is adjacent to the site in Lawn Road.

Wildlife
The site is deeply shaded and has a rich variety of species, especially of insects. The understorey is dominated hawthorn and elder, and the most common canopy trees are ash, sycamore and Swedish whitebeam. Ground level plants include butcher's-broom, enchanter's-nightshade and nettles. A number of common birds nest there.

See also

List of Sites of Special Scientific Interest in Greater London

References

Nature reserves in the London Borough of Camden
Local nature reserves in Greater London
Belsize Park